Abacetus nigrans is a species of ground beetle in the subfamily Pterostichinae. It was described by Tschitscherine in 1901.

References

nigrans
Beetles described in 1901